WGAY (105.7 FM) is a radio station broadcasting a Dance format. Licensed to Sugarloaf Key, Florida, United States, the station serves the Florida Keys area.  The station is currently owned by Magnum Radio.

References

External links

GAY-FM
Radio stations established in 2018
2018 establishments in Florida
Dance radio stations